Crassispira asthenes is a species of sea snail, a marine gastropod mollusk in the family Pseudomelatomidae.

Description

Distribution
This marine species occurs off the Lesser Antilles.

References

 Faber M.J. 2007. Marine gastropods from the ABC Islands and other localities. 24. The subfamily Crassispirinae, including the Strictispirinae, with the description of Crassispira asthenes n.sp. Miscellanea Malacologica, 2(6): 119-129

asthenes
Gastropods described in 2007